Spilarctia seriatopunctata is a moth in the family Erebidae. It was described by Victor Motschulsky in 1861. It is found in Russia (Middle Amur, Primorye, southern Sakhalin, southern Kuril Islands), China (Heilongjiang, Jilin, Jiangxi, Fujian, Sichuan, Shaanxi), Korea and Japan.

Subspecies
Spilarctia seriatopunctata seriatopunctata
Spilarctia seriatopunctata azumai (Inoue, 1982)
Spilarctia seriatopunctata nudum (Inoue, 1976)
Spilarctia seriatopunctata striatopunctata (Oberthür, 1879)
Spilarctia seriatopunctata suzukii (Inoue & Maenami, 1963)

References

Moths described in 1861
seriatopunctata